Rabdotus dealbatus  is a species of tropical, air-breathing land snail in the family Bulimulidae.

References

 Thompson, F. G. (2011). An annotated checklist and bibliography of the land and freshwater snails of México and Central America. Florida Museum of Natural History Bulletin. 50(1): 1–299.

Bulimulidae
Gastropods described in 1821